The St. John the Theologian Church is a historic Russian Orthodox church in Perryville, Alaska, United States, that was listed on the National Register of Historic Places in 1980. Now it is under Diocese of Alaska of the Orthodox Church in America.

Named for St. John the Theologian, it was built soon after Perryville was founded in 1912, by survivors from the community of Katmai, Alaska, after it was destroyed in the 1912 Katmai volcano eruption.

References 

1912 establishments in Alaska
Buildings and structures in Lake and Peninsula Borough, Alaska
Churches on the National Register of Historic Places in Alaska
Churches completed in 1912
Russian Orthodox church buildings in Alaska
Buildings and structures on the National Register of Historic Places in Lake and Peninsula Borough, Alaska